Booker T. Washington High School was a black high school in El Dorado, Arkansas.

History
School for Black children were established by 1897. Booker T. Washington High School was established in 1908. In 1949 the school moved to a new building at the intersection of Hillsboro and Quaker Streets, while the old school was repurposed as Carver Grammar School.

After the public schools integrated, the school was closed. The class of 1969 was the last graduating class before integration; the school closed in 1987. The yearbook was originally  named the "Bulletin," but later was renamed the "Hornet." 

After integration, the school was converted to a middle school.

Notable people
 Goose Tatum professional baseball and basketball player; performed 11 years with the Harlem Globetrotters.

See also
 List of things named after Booker T. Washington

References

Defunct schools in Arkansas
Buildings and structures in El Dorado, Arkansas
Schools in Union County, Arkansas
1908 establishments in Arkansas
Educational institutions established in 1908
Public high schools in Arkansas
Historically segregated African-American schools in Arkansas
1968 disestablishments in Arkansas